Aigai or Latin(ized) Aegae/ Ægæ  may refer to the following places and jurisdictions :

 Aigai (Aeolis), ancient city and former bishopric of the Aeolian dodecapolis in Asia Prima, now Nemrutkale or Nemrut Kalesi near the modern city Aliağa in northwestern Turkey and a Latin Catholic titular
 Aegae (Cilicia), ancient town of Cilicia, near modern Yumurtalık, Turkey 
 Aegae (Macedonia), first capital of the Classical kingdom of Macedonia, now Vergina
 Aegae (Achaea), ancient settlement near present Aigeira, in Achaea
 Aegae (Euboea), ancient town in Euboea, near which a sanctuary of Aegean Poseidon was built upon a hill
 Aege, ancient town in Pallene, Chalcidice

See also 
 Aigiai
 Aegeus
 Aegea 
 Aegean Sea#Etymology
 Aegospotami